is a 2D fighting game based on the manga and anime series Inuyasha. It consists of battles and minigames in an effort to retrieve shards of the sacred Jewel of Four Souls, essentially following the overall plot of the series.

Characters
A list of playable characters.

 Inuyasha 
 Kagome Higurashi
 Miroku
 Sango
 Shippo
 Naraku (Unlockable)
 Sesshomaru (Unlockable)
 Kagura (Unlockable) 
 Koga (Unlockable)
 Totosai (Unlockable)
 Demon Inuyasha (Unlockable)
 Kikyo (Unlockable)

Reception

The game received "average" reviews according to video game review aggregator Metacritic.

References

External links

Dimps' Official page

2002 video games
Dimps games
A Feudal Fairy Tale
Multiplayer and single-player video games
PlayStation (console) games
PlayStation (console)-only games
Video games developed in Japan